Linda Barnard (born 10 August 1968) is a South African former professional tennis player.

Barnard had a best singles ranking of 191 in the world and claimed three ITF titles, two of which came by beating Amanda Coetzer in the final. It was as a doubles player that she was most successful, with a career high ranking of 78. She made the third round of the women's doubles at both the 1989 US Open and 1990 Wimbledon Championships.

ITF finals

Singles: 5 (3–2)

Doubles: 12 (8–4)

References

External links
 
 

1968 births
Living people
South African female tennis players
White South African people